The 114th Engineer Battalion was an engineer battalion of the United States Army. During World War II, the battalion was attached to the 32nd Infantry Division to replace the 107th Engineer Combat Battalion, which was bound for Ireland.
They fought at Papua, New Guinea.

References

External links
 Rutgers Oral History interview with replacement soldier Michael A. Catera

Engineer battalions of the United States Army
Military units and formations established in 1943